Philanthaxia jakli is a species of beetle that was discovered in Indonesia on July, 2011. The beetle can be found in the Indonesian islands Sumatra, Borneo, and Lombok.

References

Beetles described in 2011
Buprestidae
Woodboring beetles